Uk Cheung is a village in Sai Kung District, Hong Kong.

Administration
Uk Cheung is a recognized village under the New Territories Small House Policy.

History
At the time of the 1911 census, the population of Uk Cheung was 6. The number of males was 4.

References

External links
 Delineation of area of existing village Uk Cheung (Sai Kung) for election of resident representative (2019 to 2022)

Villages in Sai Kung District, Hong Kong